The Syracuse and Chenango Valley Railroad was incorporated April 16, 1868, and had routes through the Chenango Valley from the city of Syracuse in Onondaga County to the village of Earlville in Madison County, a distance of . It was renamed to Syracuse and Chenango Railroad in 1873 and into Syracuse, Chenango and New York Railroad in 1877. 

During 1883, the road merged into Syracuse, Ontario and New York Railway and by 1891 became part of New York Central Railroad (NYCRR).

References

Predecessors of the New York Central Railroad
Defunct railroads in Syracuse, New York
Defunct New York (state) railroads
Railway companies established in 1868
Railway companies disestablished in 1883
American companies disestablished in 1883
American companies established in 1868